Zignal Labs is a SaaS-based media intelligence software service company that serves marketing and public relations departments. It was founded in 2011 and is headquartered in San Francisco.

History 
Zignal Labs was founded in 2011 by Josh Ginsberg, Adam Beaugh and Jim Hornthal, who saw a need to modernize the media war rooms used in political campaigns. They aimed to create a solution that would provide information on candidates in realtime from a variety of media sources.

After seeing success in the 2012 election under the original moniker Politear, the company changed the name to Zignal Labs and launched the media intelligence software platform into other industries. With this transition, the company used the software’s capabilities to analyze conversations and track the key influencers, issues and sentiment around enterprises. Since expanding to serve enterprise customers, Zignal Labs has provided media intelligence to a variety of different companies, ranging from AirBNB, to the Brunswick Group.

The 2016 election provided Zignal Labs with a large amount of exposure, where Zignal Command Centers were used at both the Republican and Democratic National Conventions. The company partnered with the Washington Post’s “The Daily 202”  segment to provide innovative graphics around the presidential campaign and were a part of the “CNN Politics Campaign 2016: Like, Share, Elect” exhibit at the Newseum, along with Facebook and Instagram.

In 2022, Zignal Labs was in talks with Anomaly Six about a potential partnership. The two companies decided not to proceed.

Products and services

Zignal Enterprise 
The media intelligence platform uses Big Data to provide information for marketing and PR departments. It pulls in data from TV, radio, traditional print media, online media and social media into one location, in realtime and displays it using "visualization widgets". The platform allows users to view data from a high level and then dig into discover the content that is driving the conversation.

Zignal Command Center 
The customizable multi-screen command center displays the data.

References

Software companies based in California
Software companies of the United States